Economic repression comprises various actions to restrain certain economical activities or social groups involved in economic activities. It contrasts with economic liberalization. Economists note widespread economic repression in developing countries.

The main goal of economic repression is protectionism, the instruments for which include fines and  ceilings on interest rates or exchange rates.

A common type of economic repression against individuals is blacklisting.

References